Highall Wood is a woodland to the north east of the village of Woodhall Spa, Lincolnshire. It is bordered by Park Plantation to the east and White Hall Wood to the south.

Two small streams; Reed's Beck to the south and Odd's Beck to the north also run along its edges and drain the woodland.

A Public Bridleway between Woodhall Spa and Martin runs along the eastern edge.

Forests and woodlands of Lincolnshire